Sarrazin Couture Entertainment is a motion picture and television production company founded by Pierre Sarrazin and Suzette Couture, based in Toronto, Ontario, Canada.

Sarrazin Couture productions 
 Stay with Me, a series pilot for the CTV Television Network about an at-home mother turned lawyer, who uses her wit and maternal intuition to find justice for her clients while navigating the shark-infested waters of the law and trying to raise two daughters.
 Doomstown, a portrayal of the devastating drug and gun-fueled gang wars in Toronto. Winner of the 2007 Gemini Award for Best TV Movie.
 The Man Who Lost Himself, depicting CFL Hall of Famer Terry Evanshen who lost all memory of his previous life in a horrific car crash
 The Life, chronicling two dedicated beat cops’ bold experiment to change lives of addicts on Vancouver's Downtown Eastside
 After the Harvest, starring Sam Shepard, based on the novel Wild Geese by Martha Ostenso
 The Sheldon Kennedy Story
 The City
 La Florida, winner of the Golden Reel Award (Canada).

References

External links 

 Sarrazin Couture Entertainment
 Sarrazin Couture Entertainment at the Internet Movie Database

Television production companies of Canada
Film production companies of Canada